HNoMS Brage was a Vale-class  Rendel gunboat built for the Royal Norwegian Navy at Horten Naval Yard in 1874, with build number 58. She was one of a class of five gunboats - the other ships in the class were Vale, Nor, Uller and Vidar.

Brage was, in addition to the heavy, muzzle-loading main gun, armed with a small 'Quick Fire' gun and a 37mm Hotchkiss Revolving Cannon (broadly similar to the Gatling gun).

Later Brage, like her sister ships, was rebuilt as a minelayer, and she served in this role when the Germans invaded in 1940. She was captured by German forces after the surrender of Norwegian forces in Southern Norway, and returned to Norway after the war.

Footnotes

External links
 Naval history via Flix: Vale, retrieved 27 Feb 2006

Vale-class gunboats
Ships built in Horten
1878 ships
World War II minelayers of Norway
Naval ships of Norway captured by Germany during World War II
Minelayers of the Kriegsmarine
World War II minelayers of Germany